Watsonieae is the second largest tribe in the subfamily Crocoideae (which is included in the family Iridaceae) and named after the best-known genus in it — Watsonia. The members in this group are widely distributed in Africa, mainly in its southern parts.

They sometimes have the typical sword-shaped leaves of the family Iridaceae, but sometimes, like in Lapeirousia pyramidalis or Lapeirousia divaricata, they are very specific. The rootstock is a corm.

The blooms are collected in inflorescence and sometimes have scent. They have six tepals which are identical in the most cases but sometimes has small differences. The ovary is 3-locular.

Most of these plants are not among the popular ornamental flowers. Watsonia is often used with this purpose, but the other genera are not very well known. However, they have many ornamental traits.

List of genera
Genera:
 Cyanixia
 Lapeirousia
 Micranthus
 Pillansia
 Savannosiphon
 Thereianthus
 Watsonia
 Zygotritonia

References

Iridaceae
Asparagales tribes